Marie Rouanet (Maria Roanet) (born 1936 in Béziers, Hérault) is an Occitan singer and writer.

Her father was a mechanic and she studied to be a school teacher. Since she was very interested in the history and the ethnography of her region, she started to write poems and songs in Occitan and was a member of the so-called Nova Chançon (New Song) along with Patric, Joan-Pau Verdier or Rosina de Pèira . She performed her wedding with Ives Roqueta in Occitan in 1978.

She has released records with the company Ventadorn and written several books in French.

Discography 
 Pica Relòtge, 1973
 Cantem Nadal, 1977 
 Contra corrent la Trocha Nada, 1976
 A l'Intrada del Temps clar, 1976
 Me soveni..., 1979
 Als enfants d'Occitania, 1979
 L'eternitat, 1982

Books 
  Occitanie 1970, les poètes de la décolonisation (PJ Oswald, Honfleur, 1971)
 Dins de patetas rojas (IEO, 1975; Letras d'òc, 2012)
 Apollonie,Reine au coeur du monde (1984)
 Je ne dois pas toucher les choses du jardin (1993)
 La Marche lente des glaciers (1994)
 Nous les filles (1990), memories
 Du côté des hommes (2001)
 Luxueuse austérité (2006)
 Mauvaises nouvelles de la chair (2008) 
 Trésors d'enfance (2009)
 La Nègre (2010) 
 L’Arpenteur (2012)
 Murmures pour Jean Hugo (2013)
 Abécédaire de l'Espérance (2014)
 Mon rouge Rougier (2015)
 Territoires sonores (2016)
 Émerveillements (2022)

References

External links 
 Some bibliographical references
 Bibliographical references

1936 births
Living people
People from Béziers
French women singers
French women writers
Occitan-language writers
Occitan-language singers
Women ethnologists
French ethnologists